Apeland is a surname. Notable people with the surname include:

Åsmund Apeland (1930-2010), Norwegian politician
Carl Øyvind Apeland (b. 1964), Norwegian musician
Knut Tore Apeland (b. 1968), Norwegian skier
Ola S. Apeland (b. 1964), Norwegian politician
Sigbjørn Apeland (b. 1966), Norwegian musician